Bao Linghui (fl. ca. 464) was a Chinese poet of the Southern Dynasties. A native of Donghai, Jiangsu Province, she was the younger sister of poet Bao Zhao, and, like her brother, wrote in the style of refined imitation of Han dynasty folksongs and ballads. Dates of her birth and death were unknown, but according to Bao Zhao's Qingjiaqi, she might have died during the reign of Emperor Xiaowu of Liu Song. Her poems can be found in New Songs from the Jade Terrace. Seven of her poems are extant, all of the "boudoir lament" genre, in which the poet laments the absence of her lover.

See also 
 Six dynasties poetry

References 

Works cited
 

Liu Song poets
Year of death unknown
Chinese women poets
5th-century Chinese poets
Year of birth unknown
Poets from Jiangsu
Writers from Lianyungang
5th-century Chinese women writers